Al-Zawra’a Sports Club is an Iraqi sports club based in Utayfia, Karkh District (near Tigris River), Baghdad. Their football team compete in the Iraqi Premier League, the top-flight of Iraqi football. Al-Zawra’a are the most decorated club in Iraq having won 14 Premier League titles, 16 Iraq FA Cups and 5 Iraqi Super Cups, all national records. Al-Zawra’a also won the Iraqi Elite Cup a joint-record 3 times.

Al-Zawra’a have won the domestic double a record eight times and became only the second Iraqi team to win the domestic quadruple in the 1999–2000 season. The club's most recent trophy came in 2021 with a 1–0 win over rivals Al-Quwa Al-Jawiya in the Super Cup. In 2022, Al-Zawra’a opened the new all-seater Al-Zawraa Stadium which replaced the club's old stadium at the same site.

Al-Zawra’a finished fourth at the 1996–97 Asian Club Championship and were also runners-up of the 1999–2000 Asian Cup Winners' Cup. Al-Zawra’a have competed in the AFC Champions League group stage three times and have reached the knockout rounds of the AFC Cup three times, as well as reaching the round of 16 at the Arab Club Champions Cup twice. The team's home colour is white, thus the nickname Al-Nawaris, which means The Gulls.

History
Al-Zawraa were founded on 29 June 1969 as Al-Muwasalat, which means 'Transportation'. Al-Muwasalat participated in the Iraq Central FA Fourth Division in the 1969–70 season. In the 1970–71 season, they won the fourth division and were promoted to the third division. The 1971–72 season saw the establishment of 'Al-Muwasalat B' (the club's B team) by the merging of Al-Bareed B and Al-Matar Al-Madani, and they joined the fourth division. In their first season, Al-Muwasalat B won the fourth division under coach Rasheed Radhi and were promoted to the third division, beating Al-Shabab 2–1 on 1 June 1972 at Al-Kashafa Stadium. On 16 November 1972, the club was renamed to Al-Zawraa. The 1972–73 season saw both Al-Zawraa and Al-Zawraa B competing in the third division, and in the 1973–74 season, Al-Zawraa B won the third division title, securing promotion to the second division. As they were the club's B team, the A and B teams merged back together, and the club competed in the newly founded Iraqi Second Division in the 1974–75 season. Al-Zawraa won the second division title that season under Rasheed Radhi's leadership, being promoted into the Iraqi National League for the first time in their history for the 1975–76 season.

A club named Al-Naqil (meaning 'Transport'), who were attached to the Ministry of Transport, were the runners-up of the 1974–75 Iraqi National League, but the club was dissolved due to a lack of financial backing. Al-Naqil's players joined newly-promoted side Al-Zawraa, who were founded by the Minister of Transport, Adnan Ayoub Sabri Al-Ezzi. This meant that Al-Zawraa became one of the strongest clubs in Iraq from their first season in the top-flight, which was the 1975–76 season, where they managed to win both the league title and the Iraq FA Cup. In the 1976–77 season, Al-Zawraa retained their title, winning the league undefeated, and the 1978–79 season saw Al-Zawraa win the league undefeated again, also winning the Iraq FA Cup to secure their second double.

The 1980s is the only full decade in which Al-Zawraa failed to win a league title. However, they managed to win three Iraq FA Cup titles that decade, with victories in the 1980–81, 1981–82 and 1988–89 seasons. Al-Zawraa also won the first ever Arab Cooperation Council Club Championship in 1989, and began the 1990s by retained that title as well as winning the Iraq FA Cup again and qualifying to the 1990 Arab Club Champions Cup, which was eventually abandoned. The 1990s would go on to become the most successful in Al-Zawraa's history, as they were crowned champions of Iraq for the fourth time in 1990–91 and also won another Iraq FA Cup to secure another double. Al-Zawraa won the first ever edition of the Iraqi Elite Cup in 1991 and they succeeded in winning another Iraq FA Cup in the 1992–93 season.

The next three seasons were three of the best in Al-Zawraa's history; they won three consecutive doubles in 1993–94, 1994–95 and 1995–96. They also participated in their first ever AFC tournaments, being knocked out in the first round of the 1993–94 Asian Cup Winners' Cup and the second round of the 1995 Asian Club Championship. Al-Zawraa recorded their best participation in the Asian Club Championship in 1996–97 as they reached the semi-finals, eventually finishing fourth. Al-Zawraa won the 1997–98 Iraq FA Cup which saw manager Anwar Jassam win his record fifth FA Cup, and followed that up by winning their first Iraqi Super Cup with a 1–0 win over league champions Al-Shorta. In the 1997–98 Asian Club Championship, Al-Zawraa reached the second round before being knocked out.

Al-Zawraa continued to dominate Iraqi football by winning the double in 1998–99 and securing their first domestic quadruple in 1999–2000 by winning all four domestic trophies. They also reached the final of the 1999–2000 Asian Cup Winners' Cup, the furthest that they have ever reached in a major continental competition, but lost 1–0 to Shimizu S-Pulse of Japan. As champions, Al-Zawraa qualified for the 2000–01 Asian Club Championship but were knocked out in the first round. Al-Zawraa won their third consecutive league title in 2000–01 and also won the Iraqi Super Cup, while they reached the second round of the 2001–02 Asian Club Championship and lost to Al-Sadd in 2002–03 AFC Champions League qualification.

Al-Zawraa won the Iraqi Elite Cup for the third and final time in 2003, becoming joint-record winners of the competition. In the 2003–04 Arab Champions League, Al-Zawraa were knocked out at the round of 16, while they were knocked out at the group stage of the 2005 AFC Champions League. In the 2005–06 season, Al-Zawraa secured their 11th league title by defeating Al-Najaf via a penalty shootout after a goalless draw, while in the 2005–06 Arab Champions League, they were defeated over two legs by MC Algiers in the round of 16. Al-Zawraa also participated in the 2007 AFC Champions League (knocked out in the group stage) and the 2009 AFC Cup (knocked out in the round of 16 by Erbil).

In 2010–11, they returned to the top of Iraqi football by winning their 12th league title after a penalty shootout win over Erbil. This qualified them to the 2012 AFC Cup but they were knocked out in the round of 16. Al-Zawraa won the 2015–16 league title without losing a game in what was their 13th league title. They then won the 2016–17 Iraq FA Cup and 2017 Iraqi Super Cup titles, coupling the latter with the 2017–18 Iraqi Premier League title which saw them extend their national record to 14 league triumphs. After knockout stage and group stage exits in the AFC Cup in 2017 and 2018 respectively, Al-Zawraa returned to the AFC Champions League in 2019, collecting eight points but failing to advance to the next round. The team had two impressive games against Al-Wasl, beating them 5-0 in Karbala and 5–1 at Zabeel Stadium. Al-Zawraa won the 2018–19 Iraq FA Cup, thus qualifying to the qualifying rounds of the AFC Champions League in 2020 and 2021 where they were eliminated both times. Al-Zawraa won their fifth Iraqi Super Cup title in 2021.

Stadium
Al-Zawraa currently play at Al-Zawraa Stadium, which has a capacity of 15,443. Al-Zawraa play their derby matches against Al-Quwa Al-Jawiya, Al-Shorta and Al-Talaba at Al-Shaab Stadium in order to accommodate more spectators.

Supporters
Ultras The Kings is the name of the ultras group of Al-Zawraa fans. The group was founded in response to the foundations and successes of the Ultras Green Harp (Al-Shorta) and Ultras Blue Hawks (Al-Quwa Al-Jawiya) groups. The ultras group use flares, banners and flags in order to create a good atmosphere during matches.

Current squad

First-team squad

Out on loan

Out on loan

Notable players
For a list of all Al-Zawraa players, see List of Al-Zawraa players

Retired numbers

Rivalries

Al-Zawraa's main rivals are Al-Quwa Al-Jawiya, with whom they contest the Iraqi El Clasico. They are also rivals with Al-Shorta and Al-Talaba.

Managers 

The table below shows Al-Zawraa managers of the last 10 years that have won noteworthy titles. For a more detailed and chronological list of Al-Zawraa managers from 1969 onwards with their trophies, see List of Al-Zawraa managers.

Notable managers

Current technical staff

{| class="toccolours"
!bgcolor=silver|Position
!bgcolor=silver|Name
!bgcolor=silver|Nationality
|- bgcolor=#eeeeee
|Manager:||Ayoub Odisho||
|- 
|Assistant manager:||Ali Rehema||
|- 
|Goalkeeping coach:||Emad Hashim||
|-bgcolor=#eeeeee
|Fitness coach:||Ismail Saleem||
|-
|Administrative director:||Abdul Rahman Rashid||
|-
|Age teams supervisor:||Raed Khalil||
|-bgcolor=#eeeeee
|Age teams supervisor:||Abdul Amir Naji||
|-
|Reserves coach:||Khalid Ghani||
|- 
|U19 Manager:||Abdul Mohsin Mohammed||
|- 
|U16 Manager:||Amir Qasim||
|- 
|Women's futsal coach:||Samir Saad||
|-

Honours

National

International

 
  shared record

Regional
Iraq Central FA Third Division
Winners (1): 1973–74
Iraq Central FA Fourth Division
Winners (1): 1970–71

Friendly
Arab Cooperation Council Championship
Winners (2): 1989, 1990
Victory Championship
Winners (2): 1984, 1986
Tournament for the Armed Forces
Winners (1): 2015
Tishreen Tournament
Winners (1): 2004
Al-Zawraa Championship
Winners (1): 2004
Jerusalem International Championship
Winners (1): 2000
Al-Shaab Friendship Tournament
Winners (1): 1999

Statistics

In domestic competitions

National

In international competitions

Performance in AFC competitions
AFC Champions League: 7 appearances
2003: Third qualifying round
2005: Group stage
2007: Group stage
2019: Group stage
2020: Second qualifying round
2021: Second qualifying round
2022: Second qualifying round

Asian Club Championship: 5 appearances
1996: Second round
1997: Fourth place
1998: Second round
2001: First round
2002: Second round

Asian Cup Winners' Cup: 2 appearances
1994: First round
2000: Runners-up

AFC Cup: 4 appearances
2009: Round of 16
2012: Round of 16
2017: Zonal semi-final
2018: Group stage

Individual honours
2009 FIFA Confederations Cup
The following players have played in the FIFA Confederations Cup whilst playing for Al-Zawraa:
 2009 – Mohammed Gassid

See also
 Iraqi clubs in the AFC Club Competitions

References

External links
 
 All-Time Coaches

 
Football clubs in Iraq
Football clubs in Baghdad
Sport in Baghdad
1969 establishments in Iraq
Articles which contain graphical timelines
Association football clubs established in 1969